Grand Merdeka is a shoplots comprising shopping centre, offices and mixed multi-storey in Kota Kinabalu, Sabah, Malaysia. It is modelled after the infrastructures in Mutiara Damansara, Selangor. Its shopping mall building was completed in early 2016. While the rest of the building was completed in 2017.

References 

Buildings and structures in Kota Kinabalu